Marlboro is an unincorporated community located within Marlboro Township in Monmouth County, New Jersey, United States.

The settlement is located along Route 79 north of its interchange with Route 18.

Marlboro was likely named for its early use of marl as a fertilizer.

By 1873, Marlboro had a post office, school, hotel, multiple stores, churches, and a railroad station of the Freehold and Keyport Railroad.  In 1882, the population was 102.

Marlboro was described in 1939 as having "large frame houses comfortably spaced along the highway".

References

Marlboro Township, New Jersey
Unincorporated communities in Monmouth County, New Jersey
Unincorporated communities in New Jersey